Brita may refer to:

People
 Brita Appelgren (1912–1999), Swedish film actress
 Brita Baldus (born 1965), German diver, who competed for East Germany until the unification in 1991
 Brita Biörn
 Brita Borg (1926–2010), Swedish singer, actress, and variety show artist
 Brita Borge  (1931–2013), Norwegian politician for the Conservative Party
 Brita Bratland  (1910–1975), Norwegian folk singer
 Brita Catharina Lidbeck (1788–1864), Swedish Dilettante concert singer
 Brita Collett Paus (1917–1998), Norwegian humanitarian leader
 Brita Drewsen (1887–1983), Swedish artist and businesswoman
 Brita Filter, American drag queen
 Brita Granström  (born 1969), Swedish artist who graduated from Konstfack Stockholm in 1994 and now lives and works between Great Britain and her homeland
 Brita Hagberg (1756–1825), Swedish soldier
 Brita Hazelius  (1909–1975), Swedish breaststroke swimmer who competed in the 1928 Summer Olympics
 Brita Horn (1745–1791), Swedish countess and courtier
 Brita Johansson (born 1941), Finnish athlete
 Brita Klemetintytär (1621–1700), Finnish postmaster
 Brita Koivunen (1931–2014), Finnish schlager singer
 Brita Lindholm (born 1963), Swedish curler
 Brita Nordlander (1921–2009), Swedish teacher and politician
 Brita Olofsdotter (died 1569), Finnish soldier of the Swedish cavalry
 Brita Olsdotter
 Brita Persdotter Karth
 Brita Pipare
 Brita Rosladin  (1626–1675), Swedish noblewoman
 Brita Ryy (1725–1783), Swedish educator
 Brita Sailer
 Brita Scheel (1638–1699), Danish noblewoman
 Brita Sigourney (born 1990), American freestyle skier
 Brita Snellman (1901–1978), Swedish architect
 Brita Sofia Hesselius (1801–1866), Swedish daguerreotype photographer
 Brita Sophia De la Gardie (1713–1797), Swedish noble and amateur actress
 Brita Tott
 Brita Zippel (died 1676), Swedish witch
 Brita von Cöln
 Brita von Horn (1886–1983), Swedish novelist, dramatist, director
 Brita Öberg (1900–1969), Swedish actress

Places
 Brita-Arena, Wiesbaden, Germany

Other
 1071 Brita, asteroid
 Brita (company)
 SS Brita (1908), cargo ship